Krzysztof Raczkowski (29 October 1970 – 18 August 2005), also known as Docent or Doc, was a Polish drummer, best known as a member of Polish death metal bands Vader (1988–2005) and Dies Irae. He also appeared as a guest or temporary musician in Sweet Noise, Hunter, Slashing Death, Unborn, Moon, and Overdub Trio.

Final years
In the last few years of his life, Raczkowski had been suffering serious alcohol problems.

Originally, drum sessions for Vader's album, The Beast took place at Hertz Studio in Białystok in February 2004, however, Raczkowski fell down a flight of stairs, causing arm and leg injuries. Because of the accident, the studio sessions was postponed. Ultimately, the band decided to hire Vesania drummer Dariusz "Daray" Brzozowski as a session musician. Piotr "Peter" Wiwczarek talked about the accident while working on the album, saying:

In March 2005, Krzysztof Raczkowski officially left Vader. Piotr Wiwczarek, the band's lead singer, said in an official statement on their website:

Doc pretty hard tried to 'fight' against his weaknesses, which were troubles for all of us. Finally he had not prevailed over that battle... All in all, he attempted...  Vader today is not just a friendship anymore — it's our life with armies of man involved in music, releases and, first of all, fans waiting for shows or new albums... This is a high responsibility, not too many know about. If a person, even the most talented one, cannot stand it — [he] has to leave... That was Doc's decision as well.

Maurycy Stefanowicz, the guitarist of the band, mentioned Krzysztof's problem with alcohol in an interview in April 2005.

Doc's alcohol problems eventually caused him to die unexpectedly from heart failure in August 2005. He was 34 years old. His grave is located in Korsze, Poland.

Drums setup

Discography

Vader

Other
 Slashing Death - Live at Thrash Camp (1988, demo)
 Slashing Death - Irrevocably & With No Hope (1989, demo)
 Slashing Death - Kill Me 'Coz I Can't Stop (1990, demo)
 Sweet Noise - Getto (1996, as guest)
 Moon - Daemon's Heart (1997)
 Black Altar - Na uroczysku (1998, drums programming)
 Christ Agony - Elysium (1999)
 Tower - Mercury (1999, as producer)
 Dies Irae - Immolated (2000)
 Dies Irae - The Sin War (2002)
 Sweet Noise - Revolta (2003, guest)
 Dies Irae - Sculpture of Stone (2004)
 Sweet Noise - The Triptic (2007, as member)
 Atrocious Filth - Atrocious Filth (2008)

Videography
Vader - Vision and Voice (1998, VHS)
Vader - More Vision and the Voice (2002, DVD)
Vader - Night of the Apocalypse (2005, DVD)
Dies Irae - The Art of an Endless Creation (2009, DVD)

References 

1970 births
2005 deaths
Polish heavy metal drummers
Male drummers
Vader (band) members
Drug-related deaths in Poland
People from Kętrzyn
20th-century male musicians